Foglio is an Italian surname. Notable people with the surname include:

Kaja Foglio (born 1970), American artist and writer
Paolo Foglio (born 1975), Italian footballer
Phil Foglio (born 1956), American cartoonist and comic book artist
Valerio Foglio (born 1985), Italian footballer

Italian-language surnames